Hany Omar Mohamed Said Zakaria Gad (born 22 April 1980) is an Egyptian retired professional footballer who played as a centre-back.

Club career
Born in Cairo, Egypt, Said started his youth career at Al Ahly in 1997. The following year, he moved to the Italian club AS Bari where he played for three seasons in Serie A.

In February 2003, after five years with Bari, Said moved to Serie B side Messina for the second half of the 2002–03 season. In summer 2003 he moved to Fiorentina where he could not find his place. During the 2004–2005 season he played for and suffered relegation with Belgian first-tier club Mons.

In 2006, Said left Al Masry for Ismaily.

His performances during the Africa Cup of Nations 2008 in Ghana made Said a target for Egypt's biggest clubs, Zamalek SC and Al Ahly. On 5 July 2018, Zamalek announced the signing of Said on a reported three-year contract. Two days later, it was reported Said had refused to sign the contract despite having signed a pre-contract agreement. On 12 July, Said was fined by the Egyptian Football Association  and obliging him to play Zamalek after he had stated he was not "willing to play for any team in Egypt other than Ahli".

In summer 2001, after his contract with Zamalek ended Said joined Misr Lel-Makkasa on a free transfer. In August, Zamalek attempted to re-sign him.

In April 2018, Said announced he would retire at the end of the season.

He retired in November 2019.

International career
In March 2002 CAF and FIFA banned Hany for six months after testing positive for drugs in 2002 African Cup of Nations which was held in Mali.

He returned to Egypt national team in 2004 but he did not participate in the winning team of 2006, however Hassan Shehata the coach of Egypt has recalled him in the preliminary squad for 2008 Africa Cup of Nations which won the cup too.

Honours
Egypt
 African Cup of Nations: 2008, 2010

References

External links
 
 

1980 births
Living people
Association football central defenders
Association football sweepers
Association football midfielders
Footballers from Cairo
Egyptian footballers
Egypt international footballers
2009 FIFA Confederations Cup players
2002 African Cup of Nations players
2004 African Cup of Nations players
2008 Africa Cup of Nations players
2010 Africa Cup of Nations players
AC Bellinzona players
S.S.C. Bari players
A.C.R. Messina players
ACF Fiorentina players
R.A.E.C. Mons players
Ismaily SC players
Al Ahly SC players
Al Masry SC players
Zamalek SC players
Misr Lel Makkasa SC players
Egyptian expatriate footballers
Expatriate footballers in Italy
Expatriate footballers in Belgium
Serie A players
Serie B players
Belgian Pro League players
Egyptian expatriate sportspeople in Italy
Expatriate footballers in Switzerland
Africa Cup of Nations-winning players
Egyptian Premier League players
Egyptian expatriate sportspeople in Switzerland
Egyptian expatriate sportspeople in Belgium